Rio Penasco is a 40-mile long stream located in the Pecos River watershed. It is located in Chaves County, New Mexico, Eddy County, New Mexico, and Otero County, New Mexico.

References

Rivers of Chaves County, New Mexico
Rivers of Eddy County, New Mexico
Rivers of Otero County, New Mexico